Eric Kwekeu (born 11 March 1980 in Yaoundé) is a professional Cameroonian  footballer currently playing for Sapins.

International career 
He was member of the national team at 2003 FIFA Confederations Cup; he played one match against United States at the tournament. In is his only cap with the senior national team.

External links

1980 births
Living people
Cameroonian footballers
Cameroon international footballers
2003 FIFA Confederations Cup players
Expatriate footballers in Gabon
Footballers from Yaoundé
Sapins FC players
Association football goalkeepers